"Jah No Partial" is a song by musical project Major Lazer from their second studio album Free the Universe. The song was published worldwide in October 22, 2012, and released digitally in 2013. The song features English dubstep producer and DJ Flux Pavilion.

"Jah No Partial" contains excerpts of the Johnny Osbourne song "Mr. Marshall" (from his 1980s reggae album Folly Ranking), which the song is based on. It also contains a drum sample from James Brown's live cover of the Archie Bell & the Drells song "Tighten Up".

Music video
The music video was uploaded to Major Lazer's Vevo channel on March 11, 2013. It was filmed by Shane McCauley and Aymen Ahmed, edited by Kyle DePinna, and was shot on location at the Pukkelpop Festival in Hasselt, Belgium, the Notting Hill Carnival in London, UK, and the Mad Decent Block Party in Philadelphia, Pennsylvania. Johnny Osbourne, whose vocals are sampled in the track, appears in the video's introduction while the members of Major Lazer (Diplo, Jillionaire and Walshy Fire) are seen arriving at the festival and performing. It features Diplo zorbing on the crowd and crowd surfing. British singer Rita Ora also appears in the video standing behind the decks.

Track listing
UK promotional CD single
 "Jah No Partial"  – 4:13

Chart performance
The song reached number 59 on the Flanders Ultratip chart and number 39 on Belgium Dance chart.

Release history

References

External links 
Major Lazer: Making of Jah No Partial - YouTube
Major Lazer ft Flux Pavilion "Jah No Partial" - OFFICIAL HQ LYRIC VIDEO - YouTube

2012 songs
2013 singles
Major Lazer songs
Songs written by Flux Pavilion
Songs written by Diplo
Song recordings produced by Flux Pavilion
V2 Records singles